Elections to Antrim Borough Council were held on 7 June 2001 on the same day as the other Northern Irish local government elections. The election used three district electoral areas to elect a total of 19 councillors.

Election results

Note: "Votes" are the first preference votes.

Districts summary

|- class="unsortable" align="centre"
!rowspan=2 align="left"|Ward
! % 
!Cllrs
! % 
!Cllrs
! %
!Cllrs
! %
!Cllrs
! % 
!Cllrs
! %
!Cllrs
!rowspan=2|TotalCllrs
|- class="unsortable" align="center"
!colspan=2 bgcolor="" | UUP
!colspan=2 bgcolor="" | DUP
!colspan=2 bgcolor="" | SDLP
!colspan=2 bgcolor="" | Sinn Féin
!colspan=2 bgcolor="" | Alliance
!colspan=2 bgcolor="white"| Others
|-
|align="left"|Antrim North West
|18.2
|1
|18.0
|1
|bgcolor="#99FF66"|30.4
|bgcolor="#99FF66"|2
|24.0
|1
|2.3
|0
|7.1
|0
|5
|-
|align="left"|Antrim South East
|bgcolor="40BFF5"|40.4
|bgcolor="40BFF5"|3
|23.4
|2
|15.4
|1
|8.7
|1
|7.2
|0
|4.9
|0
|7
|-
|align="left"|Antrim Town
|bgcolor="40BFF5"|37.5
|bgcolor="40BFF5"|3
|25.7
|2
|19.5
|2
|7.8
|0
|6.4
|0
|3.1
|0
|7
|-
|- class="unsortable" class="sortbottom" style="background:#C9C9C9"
|align="left"| Total
|33.0
|7
|22.5
|5
|21.0
|5
|12.5
|2
|5.5
|0
|5.5
|0
|19
|-
|}

Districts results

Antrim North West

1997: 2 x SDLP, 1 x Sinn Féin, 1 x DUP, 1 x UUP
2001: 2 x SDLP, 1 x Sinn Féin, 1 x DUP, 1 x UUP
1997-2001 Change: No change

Antrim South East

1997: 4 x UUP, 1 x DUP, 1 x SDLP, 1 x Alliance
2001: 3 x UUP, 2 x DUP, 1 x SDLP, 1 x Sinn Féin
1997-2001 Change: DUP and Sinn Féin gain from UUP and Alliance

Antrim Town

1997: 4 x UUP, 1 x DUP, 1 x SDLP, 1 x Alliance
2001: 3 x UUP, 2 x DUP, 2 x SDLP
1997-2001 Change: DUP and SDLP gain from UUP and Alliance

References

Antrim Borough Council elections
Antrim